Eric Butorac and Raven Klaasen were the defending champions, but Klaasen chose to compete in Rotterdam instead.  Butorac played alongside Rajeev Ram, but they lost in the quarterfinals to Artem Sitak and Donald Young.

Seeds

Draw

Draw

References
 Main Draw

Memphis Open - Doubles
2015 Men's Doubles